Lacrosse in Spain has its origins in the 2000s in Madrid. It is currently governed by the Spanish Lacrosse Association.

Spanish Lacrosse Association

The Spanish Lacrosse Association (in Spanish: Asociación Española de Lacrosse) is the official governing body of lacrosse in Spain and is a member of the Federation of International Lacrosse and the European Lacrosse Federation. It was founded to develop and promote lacrosse within Spain.

It conducts the men's and the women's teams.

Club tournaments

LEL
The Liga Española de Lacrosse is the main lacrosse competition in Spain. Until 2013, it was usual that teams without enough players played combined. Since 2014, a new league format was approved dividing teams into LEL and LEL2, joining the LEL only the teams that have at least ten players.

In 2011, the league changed its name to Liga Ibérica de Lacrosse as Portuguese team ACM Coimbra participated in two stages of the league.

LEL 2
The Liga Española de Lacrosse 2 was created in 2014 and is the second tier of the Spanish lacrosse league system. It is played in a 5x5 format between the reserve teams of LEL and teams that have few players.

LELF
The Liga Española de Lacrosse Femenino is the main women's league in Spain. It was played by the first time in 2014 with seven teams, four of them combined in two. In 2013 there were played several exhibition games during the LEL rounds between Madrid and Cuenca, the two first women's lacrosse teams in Spain.

Editions of the Spanish Lacrosse League

2014
The 2014 Liga Española de Lacrosse was the 4th edition of this tournament. Composed by three teams, it was the first edition played with a round-robin tournament with the clubs with more than 11 players in their roster.

2015
The 2015 Liga Española de Lacrosse was the 5th edition of this tournament. Composed by four teams, it was played between 3 February and 14 June. ANV Cuervos retired after its first game (17–0 against Madrid) and all its games were declared with a result of 0–15; however, they are not included in this table.

2016
The 2016 Liga Española de Lacrosse was the 6th edition of this tournament. Composed by four teams, it was played between 4 March and 19 June with a double round-robin tournament format, giving 2 points for a win and one points for a loss. Cancelled games would penalise the team implied with four points.

2016–17
The 2016–17 Liga Española de Lacrosse was the 7th edition of the main Spanish Lacrosse League. For this edition, the old division between LEL and LEL2 was abolished and a new competition system was instated. The seven teams were divided into two conferences:

Eastern Conference: Alicante Barefoots, Cuenca Lacrosse and Barcelona Dracs
Western Conference: Lisboa Gladiators, Sevilla Lacrosse, Madrid Lacrosse and Montes Lacrosse

Each team would play home and away against the other two teams of its conference and will play also one more game home and other away against two different teams, totalling six games played per team. The inter-conference games were decided taking the distance of the teams as main criteria.

The seven first qualified teams overall will qualify directly to the quarterfinals while the two bottom teams will play themselves a previous game to qualify.

Regular season
Regular season started on 29 October 2016 and ended on 22 April 2017.

Playoffs
The playoffs took part in Madrid on 6 and 7 May 2017.

2017–18
The 2017–18 Liga Española de Lacrosse is the 8th edition of the Spanish Lacrosse League. The seven teams from the previous season and the reserve team of Barcelona Dracs will join the competition. These eight teams were divided into the same conferences as in the previous season:

Eastern Conference: Alicante Barefoots, Cuenca Bucks, Barcelona Dracs and Barcelona Dracs B
Western Conference: Lisboa Gladiators, Sevilla Lacrosse, Madrid Lacrosse and Montes Lacrosse

Regular season
The regular season started on 11 November 2017.

Playoffs
Playoffs took part in Seville.

Fifth position group
Cuenca Lacrosse 2–4 Barcelona Dracs B
Barcelona Dracs B 5–2 Lisboa Gladiators
Cuenca Lacrosse 9–3 Lisboa Gladiators

References

External links
AEL website
Lacrosse blog in Spanish

 
Lacrosse